Vilnes Church is a parish church of the Church of Norway in Askvoll Municipality in Vestland county, Norway. It is located in the village of Vilnes on the south side of the island of Atløyna. It is one of several churches for the Askvoll parish which is part of the Sunnfjord prosti (deanery) in the Diocese of Bjørgvin. The brown, wooden church was built in a long church style in 1674 using designs by the local parish priest, Otthe Jonassøn. The church seats about 130 people.

History
The earliest existing historical records of the church date back to the year 1330, but the church was not new that year. The original church at Vilnes was likely a wooden stave church. The altarpiece is dated as 1250 AD, so it is very likely the church was built around that time. The old medieval church stood for centuries until 1673 when it was struck by lightning and burned to the ground.

The following spring and summer, the parish residents quickly built a new church using plans by the local parish priest, Otthe Jonassøn. Not being an architect, the church was completed, but there were some areas of the design that were lacking. In 1686, the church had to replace part of the roof that had not been built correctly. The church was cold and drafty, and often on a windy and snowy day, some snow was able to find its way into the church.

After World War II, the architects Johan Lindstrøm and his son Claus Lindstrøm were hired to renovate, restore, and upgrade the church. The project lasted throughout the 1950s, and they took care to maintain the historical look of the church. They rebuilt the roofs, insulated the walls, and added lights and heating. They also added a sacristy on the north side of the chancel.

See also
List of churches in Bjørgvin

References

Askvoll
Churches in Vestland
Wooden churches in Norway
Long churches in Norway
17th-century Church of Norway church buildings
Churches completed in 1674
13th-century establishments in Norway